One Hundred Thousand Bad Jokes is a 2014 Chinese animated fantasy comedy film directed by Lu Hengyu and Li Shujie. It was released on December 31.

Voice cast
Ketsu
Huangzhenji
Bao Mu Zhong Yang
Xin Shan
Zhuquecheng
Hameng Tute 
Lu Hengyu
Sidaohuizhang

Reception
The film earned  at the Chinese box office.

See also
One Hundred Thousand Bad Jokes

References

External links

2014 animated films
2014 films
2010s fantasy comedy films
Chinese animated fantasy films
Animated films based on manhua
Films based on webcomics
2014 comedy films